Arbudas submacula is a moth of the family Zygaenidae. It is found in Taiwan.

References

Moths described in 1910
Chalcosiinae
Moths of Taiwan